Abduction is a 1998 card game published by Eden Studios.

Gameplay
Abduction is a game in which the players are victims of an alien abduction trying to escape an alien ship.

Reception
The online second version of Pyramid reviewed Abduction and commented that "Abduction is a card game that ties loosely into Eden's Conspiracy X roleplaying game. You got the same big-headed aliens, the same random humans (and one cow) brought aboard a spaceship, and the same unspeakable experiments."

Reviews
Backstab #15

References

Card games introduced in 1998
Eden Studios games